The first-seeds Jack Crawford and Harry Hopman defeated Jack Cummings and Gar Moon 6–1, 6–8, 4–6, 6–1, 6–3 in the final, to win the men's doubles tennis title at the 1929 Australian Championships.

Seeds

  Jack Crawford /  Harry Hopman (champions)
 ( Ian Collins /  Colin Gregory) (semifinals) 
  Jack Cummings /  Gar Moon (final)
  Pat O'Hara Wood /  Ernest Rowe (quarterfinals)
 n/a 
  Bob Schlesinger /  Rupert Wertheim (semifinals)
  Gar Hone /  Ron Hone (quarterfinals)
  Jim Black /  Don Turnbull (first round)

Draw

Draw

Notes

References

External links
 Source for seedings

1929 in Australian tennis
Men's Doubles